The Tifton Tifters were a minor league baseball team based in Tifton, Georgia. In 1917, the Tifters played a shortened season as members of the six team, Class D level Dixie League, hosting home games at the Tifton Baseball Park. The tilters finished last in the league, which folded during the season. The Tilters were succeeded by the 1949 Tifton Blue Sox, who returned to minor league play as members of the Georgia State League.

History
In 1917, minor league baseball began in Tifton, when the Tifton "Tifters" became members of the Class D level Dixie League, with the nickname reflecting the city of Tifton and its location in Tift County. 

The Bainbridge, Dothan, Eufaula, Moultrie Packers, Quitman and Valdosta Millionaires teams joined the Tifters in beginning league play on May 6, 1917.

On July 5, 1917, the Tifters had a record of 18–37 when the Dixie League folded with Tifton in last place. Managed by player/manager Doc Newton, the Tifters ended the season in sixth place and finished 17.5 games behind the first place Moultrie Packers in the final standings. The Tilters finished behind the Moultrie (36–20), Eufaula (31–23), Bainbridge (32–25), Dolthan (25–30), and Quitman (25–32) teams in the 1917 league standings.

In 1949, minor league baseball returned to Tifton, when the Tifton Blue Sox began a tenure as members of the Class D level Georgia State League.

The ballpark
The 1917 Tifton Tifters hosted minor league home games at the Tifton Base Ball Park. The ballpark had a capacity of 1,700 and was located at North College Avenue & North Ridge Avenue at West 4th Street, Tifton, Georgia. The site is still in use today with ballfields.

Year–by–year records

Notable alumni
Guy Lacy (1917)
Bobby LaMotte (1917)
 Doc Newton (1917, MGR)

See also
Tifton Tifters players

References

External links
Tifton - Baseball Reference
Defunct minor league baseball teams
Defunct baseball teams in Georgia
Baseball teams established in 1917
Baseball teams disestablished in 1917
Defunct Dixie League teams
Tift County, Georgia